By-elections to the 3rd Canadian Parliament were held to elect members of the House of Commons of Canada between the 1874 federal election and the 1878 federal election. The Liberal Party of Canada led a majority government for the 3rd Canadian Parliament.

The number of by-elections is notable and so is the number that were of successfully contested, mainly because courts in Canada began to take a more objective view of petitions at that time, following legal reforms on election procedure. Despite many new elections being called, many politicians were nonetheless reelected a second time. 

The following list includes Ministerial by-elections which occurred due to the requirement that Members of Parliament recontest their seats upon being appointed to Cabinet. These by-elections were almost always uncontested. This requirement was abolished in 1931.

References
 Parliament of Canada–Elected in By-Elections

See also
List of federal by-elections in Canada

1878 elections in Canada
1877 elections in Canada
1876 elections in Canada
1875 elections in Canada
1874 elections in Canada
03rd